Alex Waislitz (born 1958) is an Australian businessman.

Waislitz was elected to the Collingwood Football Club Board of Directors in 1998, elected as vice-president in 2009, and has provided philanthropic support to the club.

Early life and education
Waislitz was born to a Jewish family. Both his Warsaw-born father, David (1922-2009), and his mother were immigrants from Poland. He graduated from Monash University in 1979 with a Bachelor of Laws and Commerce; and completed the executive education course Owner/President Management Program of the Harvard Business School after acquiring his wealth.

Career
Waislitz has been a member of several Boards of directors. He is director of various Pratt Group and Visy Industries companies. In 1991 he founded Thorney Investment Group and served as inaugural executive director until 2009. Thorney invests in public securities, private companies and property, and has close connection to the Pratt family investments. Thorney specialises in emerging companies across a broad range of industries including manufacturing, technology, mining services and resources. In 2016 the Australian Taxation Office revealed that the company had paid no tax in 2013-14, despite revenue of 430 million.

Waislitz has served as a Director of Collingwood Football Club since 1998 and as Vice President of the Club since 2009.

He is also a member of the International Advisory Board for Master of Business Administration (MBA) at Ben-Gurion University School of Management.

Waislitz is also a movie producer; and has produced movies such as Hotel de Love & Joey.

Personal life
In 1994 Waislitz married Heloise Pratt, daughter of businessman Richard Pratt and his wife, Jeanne. They had three children, Jacob Waislitz, Amelia Waislitz and Joseph Waislitz. Waislitz and his wife separated in 2015.

Net worth

References

External links
Profile from the Collingwood Football Club website

Businesspeople from Melbourne
Monash University alumni
1958 births
Australian Jews
Australian people of Polish-Jewish descent
Collingwood Football Club administrators
Living people
Australian billionaires